Betty Link ( Henry, March 11, 1922 – September 10, 1944) was an American female international table tennis player.

Henry was born in South Bend, Indiana on March 11, 1922. She won a bronze at the 1938 World Table Tennis Championships in the women's singles. Henry died in South Bend on September 10, 1944, at the age of 22.

See also
 List of table tennis players
 List of World Table Tennis Championships medalists

References

1922 births
1944 deaths
20th-century American women
American female table tennis players
World Table Tennis Championships medalists